Yuichi Kodama (児玉裕一 Kodama Yuichi） is a Japanese video director. He has mainly directed music videos and ads. He often produces music videos and ads that are strongly connected or "tied-up" to each other, such as Perfume's "Secret Secret" and Morinaga Milk's "Eskimo Pino", or Amuro Namie's songs and Vidal sassoon's ads.

In 2008, he won 3 awards in the Cannes International Advertising Festival, 4 awards in the Clio Awards and 3 awards in the One Show Interactive for a project he did for UNIQLOCK. Kodama is an alumnus of Tohoku University.

Music videos
2022
 Ed Sheeran – "Celestial"
 Hikaru Utada – "Somewhere Near Marseilles ―マルセイユ辺りー　-LIVE at Sea Paradise"

2020
 Fujii Kaze - "Kaerou"

2018
 Perfume - "Future Pop"

2017
 Wednesday Campanella - "Ikkyu-san"

2015
 Ringo Sheena - "No verão, as noites / God, nor Buddha"
 Perfume - "Pick Me Up"

2011
Tokyo Jihen - "Sora ga Natteiru"
Tokyo Jihen - "Onna no Ko wa Daredemo"
2010
Nanba Shiho - "Gomen ne, Watashi"
Perfume - "Natural ni Koishite" "Nee"
salyu - "Extension"

2009
Sakanaction - "Native Dancer"
Ringo Sheena - "Tsugou no Ii Karada"
SAWA - "Swimming Dancing"

2008
 Perfume - "Secret Secret"
 Ringo Sheena -"Mellow"
 Midorikawa Shobo -"Dare Yorimo Anata wo"
POLYSICS - "Pretty good"
SAWA - "ManyColors"
Base Ball Bear - "17 sai" "changes"
Mr.Children "Esora" filmed with Morimoto Chie, as "Kodama goen゜"
RADWIMPS - "Order Made"
Amuro Namie - "NEW LOOK"

2007
POLYSICS - "Catch On Everywhere" "Hard Rock Thunder"
Tokyo Jihen "OSCA" "Killer Tune" "Senkou Shoujo"
Base Ball Bear - "Ai Shiteru"
bird - "SPARKLES"
m-flo Crystal Kay - "Love Don't Cry"
RIP SLYME - "I.N.G"
YOUR SONG IS GOOD "Aitsu ni Yoroshiku"
Hitomitoi - "Konayuki no Spur"
Rekishi - "Rekishi Brand-new Day"
Midorikawa Shobo "OH! G men" "Koi ni Ikiru Hito""Kouetsu no Hito"

2006
Base Ball Bear - "Electric Summer" "Girlfriend" "Matsuri no Ato"
Polysics - Electric Surfin' Go Go" "I My Me Mine"
MIdorikawa shobo "I am a mother" "Ringo Girl"
Go! Go! 7188 "Kinkyori Renai"
Ishino Takkyu - "Siren"
Captain Straydum - "Fusen Gum"

2005
QURULI - "BIRTHDAY"
Ando Yuko - "Samishigariya no Kotobatachi"
CHEMISTRY -"Wings of Words"
Suneo hair - "Waltz"
Midorikawa shobo - "Kao 2005" "Sorezore ni Shinjitsu ga Aru"

2004
Midorikawa shobo -"Baka Kyodai" "Hokenshitsu no Sensei"
Dreams Come True - "Ola! Vitoria!"
YUKI - "Hello Goodbye"

2003
Suneo Hair - "Uguisu" "Fuyu no Tubasa" "Over the River" "Communication "Seikou Toutei" "Pinto"

2002
Suneo Hair - "Wake mo Shiranaide" "ivory" "JImon Jidou"

Ads
Only particularly notable ones are mentioned:

2010
Ezaki Glico - "Waterring Kiss Mint Gum" featuring Tokyo Jihen - "Kachi Ikusa"
2009
McDonald Japan ”Quarter Pounder” featuring Amuro Namie
P&G -Vidal Sassoon "Bourgeois Gorgeous" featuring Amuro Namie - "Dr."
UNIQLO - "UNIQLOCK" Season 5

2008
Morinaga Milk -"Eskimo Pino" featuring Perfume - "Secret Secret"
UNIQLO - "UNIQLOCK" Season 2,3,4
Kanebo - KATE "CONFUSION"
P&G - Vidal Sassoon "Fashion×Music×VidalSasoon 60s" featuring Amuro Namie - "NEW LOOK"

2007
UNIQLO - UNIQLOCK blog parts
NEC - "FOMA N904i"
SONY - VAIO Entermercial(entertainment+commercial), featuring RIP SLYME - "I.N.G"

2006
Nintendo：bit Generation
Keio Corporation - "Akai Densha Akai Futari" featuring QURULI - "Akai Densha"

Filmography
 Kuso-yarō to Utsukushiki Sekai (2018)

References

External links
 Caviar　Co., Ltd.
 Tokyo Video Magazine VIS
 White-Screen
 PUBLIC-IMAGE.ORG Interview

Living people
People from Niigata (city)
Japanese music video directors
1975 births